Mage: The Ascension is a tabletop role-playing game in the World of Darkness series, where players take the roles of mages. It was originally released by White Wolf Publishing in 1993, and released in new editions in 1995 (second edition), 2000 (Revised Edition), and 2015 (20th Anniversary Edition), which update the game rules. These have been supported with supplementary game books, expanding the game mechanics and setting.

The books from the game's original run in 1993–2004 were published by White Wolf Publishing, sometimes under their imprint Black Dog Game Factory for books considered more adult. Onyx Path Publishing, a company formed by ex–White Wolf Publishing staff, released five further supplements for the Revised Edition in 2012–2013, and are the publisher of the 20th Anniversary Edition books.

The supplements include the Tradition Book and Technocracy series, both covering groups of mages; guides to the game; and various other books. Adventure modules have been released, but only rarely, as White Wolf Publishing has preferred to let storytellers construct their own adventures, an uncommon choice in tabletop role-playing games that they could afford due to the World of Darkness series' success and longevity. Mage: The Ascension was one of their three highest selling game lines, along with Vampire: The Masquerade and Werewolf: The Apocalypse, and also performed well commercially for Onyx Path Publishing.

Books

First edition (1993–1995)

Second edition (1995–1999)

Revised Edition (2000–2004 and 2012–2013)

20th Anniversary Edition (2014–present)

Compilations

Notes

References

External links
 Official Mage: The Ascension website

Mage: The Ascension
Mage: The Ascension
Mage: The Ascension